Oleg Arcadievich Eremeev (28 September 1922 –  16 March 2016) was a Soviet Russian painter, People's Artist of the Russian Federation, a full member of the Academy of Arts of the Russian Federation (2001), a head of the Repin Institute of Arts (1990-2001), and a member of the Saint Petersburg Union of Artists (before 1992 known as the Leningrad Union of Artists), who lived and worked in Saint Petersburg. He was regarded as one of the representatives of the Leningrad school of painting, most famous for his genre and portrait paintings. He died in 2016.

See also
 List of 20th-century Russian painters
 List of painters of Saint Petersburg Union of Artists

References

Bibliography 
 Грабарь И. Заметки о живописи на Всесоюзной выставке 1957 года // Искусство. 1958, № 1. С.14-17.
 Ленинград. Зональная выставка 1964 года. Каталог. Л, Художник РСФСР, 1965. C.19.
 Колесова О. Две тысячи встреч. На выставке «Ленинград». // Ленинградская правда, 1964, 4 ноября.
 Каталог весенней выставки произведений ленинградских художников 1965 года. Л., Художник РСФСР, 1970. С.14.
 Наш современник. Зональная выставка произведений ленинградских художников 1975 года. Каталог. Л., Художник РСФСР, 1980. C.15.
 Изобразительное искусство Ленинграда. Каталог выставки. Л., Художник РСФСР, 1976. C.14.
 Выставка произведений ленинградских художников, посвящённая 60-летию Великого Октября. Л., Художник РСФСР, 1982. С.14.
 Справочник членов Союза художников СССР. Том 1. М., Советский художник, 1979. C.362.
 Зональная выставка произведений ленинградских художников 1980 года. Каталог. Л., Художник РСФСР, 1983. C.13.
 Справочник членов Ленинградской организации Союза художников РСФСР. Л., Художник РСФСР, 1987. C.42.
 Связь времён.  1932-1997. Художники - члены Санкт - Петербургского Союза художников России. Каталог выставки. СПб., ЦВЗ "Манеж", 1997. С.287.
 Matthew Cullerne Bown. A Dictionary of Twentieth Century Russian And Soviet Painters. 1900 — 1980s. — London: Izomar Limited, 1998.
 Мы помним… Художники, искусствоведы – участники Великой Отечественной войны. М., Союз художников России, 2000. С.104.
 Sergei V. Ivanov. Unknown Socialist Realism. The Leningrad School. Saint Petersburg, NP-Print Edition, 2007. P.391, 398, 403, 405, 406. , .
 Юбилейный Справочник выпускников Санкт-Петербургского академического института живописи, скульптуры и архитектуры имени И. Е. Репина Российской Академии художеств. 1915—2005. СПб., 2007. С.78.
 Участникам Второй мировой и Великой Отечественной войны посвящается... Альбом-каталог. СПб., 2010. С.38-41.

1922 births
2016 deaths
Soviet military personnel of World War II
20th-century Russian painters
Russian male painters
21st-century Russian painters
Soviet painters
Socialist realist artists
Leningrad School artists
Members of the Leningrad Union of Artists
Repin Institute of Arts alumni
Russian portrait painters
20th-century Russian male artists
21st-century Russian male artists